is a shallow tray used in the Japanese kitchen to place food on after deep frying. The shallow tray or pan has a rack and an absorbent paper towel to remove excess oil from the food after frying, as for example in tempura.

The Abura kiri is usually used in combination with metal ended Japanese kitchen chopsticks, a net ladle or scoop ami shakushi,  and a heavy frying pot agemono nabe.

See also
List of Japanese cooking utensils

Japanese food preparation utensils